Čaglavica is a village near Pristina, Kosovo.

History

2004 unrest in Kosovo 

During the unrests in March 2004 that occurred throughout Kosovo, 12000 Kosovo Albanian rioters tried to storm the Serb-populated areas of Čaglavica. Norwegian and Swedish peacekeepers from KFOR created a blockade by using tear gas, rubber bullets, and stun grenades, in order to keep the two groups apart. A truck was driven by a Kosovo Albanian at full speed towards the barricade in an attempt to penetrate the line. After firing warning shots at the truck, the Norwegians had to use deadly force to avoid friendly casualties, and shot the driver. 16 Norwegian peacekeepers were injured, and 13 of them had to be evacuated. Another KFOR unit consisting of mostly Swedish soldiers also participated in defending Čaglavica that day, supported by people from the barracks who normally worked with non-military tasks. Lieutenant Colonel Hans Håkansson, who commanded 700 people during the unrest, reported that the fighting went on for 11 hours, and that many collapsed due to dehydration and broken limbs while struggling to fend off waves of rioters. In total, 35 people were injured while defending the town. Hans Håkansson was awarded with a medal for his actions by the Royal Swedish Academy of War Sciences in 2005.

Notes

References 

Villages in Gračanica, Kosovo
Serbian enclaves in Kosovo